Theodore Roosevelt (1858–1919) was the president of the United States from 1901 to 1909.

Theodore Roosevelt may also refer to:

Theodore Roosevelt Sr. (1831–1878), the president's father
Theodore Roosevelt Jr. (1887–1944), the president's eldest son
Theodore Roosevelt III (1914–2001), the president's grandson
Theodore Roosevelt IV (born 1942), the president's great-grandson
T. R. Dunn (born 1955) former American basketball player

See also
 
USS Theodore Roosevelt, several ships
Theodore Roosevelt: An Autobiography, an autobiographical book by the President of the United States